The Niida Indoor Rink, officially Technol Ice Park Hachinohe (テクノルアイスパーク八戸) is an arena in the city of Hachinohe, Aomori, Japan. It is used for ice hockey and figure skating; and is the home arena of Tohoku Free Blades of the Asia League Ice Hockey.

It was opened in 1984 and holds 1,576 seats.

It is located within the Niida Park in Hachinohe.

References

 Official site 

Indoor ice hockey venues in Japan
Indoor arenas in Japan
Sports venues completed in 1984
Hachinohe
1984 establishments in Japan
Sports venues in Aomori Prefecture